Copelatus onorei is a species of diving beetle. It is part of the genus Copelatus in the subfamily Copelatinae of the family Dytiscidae. It was described by Pederzani & Rocchi in 1982.

References

onorei
Beetles described in 1982